Yenda Thalaiyila Yenna Vekkala is a 2018 Tamil language fantasy comedy film written and directed by Vignesh Karthick and produced by A. R. Reihana. Azhar, Sanchita Shetty and Eden Kuriakose play the film's lead roles, amongst an ensemble cast. The film began production in mid-2015 and was released on 23 February 2018.

Cast

Azhar as Praveen
Sanchita Shetty as Ramya
Singapore Deepan as Sattaiyappan
Yogi Babu as Aadhi 
Vazhakku En Muthuraman as Praveen's father 
Uma Padmanabhan as Praveen's mother
Maya S. Krishnan as Dora
Archana Chandhoke as Thaara
Dr. Sharmila as Tv show host
Sumathi as Yogi Babu's wife
Eden Kuriakose as Deenavyashini
Lokesh Pop Aady as Ad agent
KPY Ramar as Singer
Vignesh Karthick in a special appearance as Praveen's friend
Amir as dancer
Sasikumar Sivalingam as one of the interviewer in the panel

Production
A. R. Reihana announced that she would debut as a producer with a fantasy comedy film during July 2015 and revealed that newcomer Azhar and Sanchita Shetty would play the lead roles. Reihana picked Vignesh Karthick to direct the film, and revealed that she was motivated to become a producer in order to make sure her music is better picturised on screen. Vignesh Karthick had previously worked in different professions on television serials, while Azhar had worked as a radio jockey. The film was shot throughout late 2015 and 2016, with the title Yenda Thalaiyila Yenna Vekkala announced after production was completed. Reihana also revealed that she was hopeful that her actor-composer son, G. V. Prakash Kumar, would portray a small role in the film.

Soundtrack

The film's music was composed by the film's producer A. R. Reihana, with four different lyricists working on the album. The soundtrack was released on 29 April 2017 through Divo.

References

External links 

2010s Tamil-language films
Indian fantasy comedy films
2010s fantasy comedy films
Films scored by A. R. Reihana
2018 films
2018 comedy films